Chocoladefabriken Lindt & Sprüngli AG, doing business as Lindt, is a Swiss chocolatier and confectionery company founded in 1845 and known for its chocolate truffles and chocolate bars, among other sweets. It is based in Kilchberg, where its main factory and museum are located.

History

Founding and early years

The origins of the company date back to 1836, when David Sprüngli-Schwarz (1776–1862) and his son Rudolf Sprüngli-Ammann (1816–1897) bought a small confectionery shop in the old town of Zürich, producing chocolates under the name David Sprüngli & Son. Before they moved to Paradeplatz in 1845, they established a small factory where they produced their chocolate in solidified form in 1838.

When Rudolf Sprüngli-Ammann retired in 1892, he gave two equal parts of the business to his sons. The younger brother David Robert received two confectionery stores that became known under the name Confiserie Sprüngli. The elder brother Johann Rudolf received the chocolate factory. To raise the necessary finances for his expansion plans, Johann Rudolf then converted his private company into "Chocolat Sprüngli AG" in 1899. In that same year, he acquired the chocolate factory of Rodolphe Lindt (1855–1909) in Bern, and the company changed its name to "Aktiengesellschaft Vereinigte Berner und Zürcher Chocoladefabriken Lindt & Sprüngli" (United Bern and Zurich Lindt and Sprungli Chocolate Factory Ltd.).

In 1934, Lindt started to produce milk chocolate. Until then, it only produced dark chocolate.

Expansion
In 1994, Lindt & Sprüngli acquired the Austrian chocolatier Hofbauer Österreich and integrated it, along with its Küfferle brand, into the company. In 1997 and 1998, respectively, the company acquired the Italian chocolatier Caffarel and the American chocolatier Ghirardelli, and integrated both of them into the company as wholly-owned subsidiaries. Since then, Lindt & Sprüngli has expanded the once-regional Ghirardelli to the international market.

On 17 March 2009, Lindt announced the closure of 50 of its 80 retail boutiques in the United States because of weaker demand in the wake of the late-2000s recession.

Recent developments
On 14 July 2014, Lindt bought Russell Stover Candies, maker of Whitman's Chocolate, for about $1 billion, the company's largest acquisition to date.

In November 2018, Lindt opened its first American travel retail store in JFK Airport's Terminal 1 and its flagship Canadian shop in Yorkdale Shopping Centre, Toronto.

In response to Russia's invasion of Ukraine, Lindt announced that it would halt commercial operations in Russia on a temporary basis.

Factories
Lindt & Sprüngli has 12 factories: Kilchberg, Switzerland; Aachen, Germany; Oloron-Sainte-Marie, France; Induno Olona, Italy; Gloggnitz, Austria; and Stratham, New Hampshire, in the United States. The factory in Gloggnitz, Austria, manufactures products under the Hofbauer & Küfferle brand in addition to the Lindt brand. Caffarel's factory is located in Luserna San Giovanni, Italy, and Ghirardelli's factory is located in San Leandro, California, in the United States. Furthermore, there are four more factories of Russell Stover in the United States including locations in Corsicana, Texas, Abilene, Kansas, and Iola, Kansas.

Since 2020, the main factory of Kilchberg includes a visitor centre and museum, referred to as Lindt Home of Chocolate. The museum notably displays the world's largest chocolate fountain, measuring over nine metres tall and containing 1,500 litres of chocolate, flowing from a giant whisk.

Lindt chocolate cafés and stores
Lindt has opened over 410 chocolate cafés and shops all over the world. The cafés' menu mostly focuses on chocolate and desserts. Lindt chocolate cafés also sell handmade chocolates, macaroons, cakes, and ice cream.

On 15 December 2014, 18 people, including eight staff, were held hostage at a Lindt cafe in Sydney. Three people, including the gunman, died in the incident.

Criticism
In September 2017, an investigation conducted by NGO Mighty Earth found that a large amount of the cocoa used in chocolate produced by Lindt and other major chocolate companies was grown illegally in national parks and other protected areas in the Ivory Coast and Ghana, the world's two largest cocoa producers. Mighty Earth's 2019 annual "Easter Chocolate Shopping Guide" awarded The Good Egg Award to Lindt "for greatest improvement in sustainable policies".  However, in terms of agroforestry, Lindt scored only a yellow rating, the second highest of 4, for Agroforestry and a red ('needs to catch up with the industry') for Agrochemical Management on the 2022 Chocolate Scorecard which since 2020 is a collaboration between Mighty Earth, Be Slavery Free and other NGOs. 

In August 2020, the Federal Antimonopoly Service of Russia (FAS) opened up an antitrust case against Lindt after a failed response from the company a year earlier. The regulators have found quality differences for the same Lindt products in Russia over what is being sold in Western Markets without informing Russian consumers. According to the FAS, such behavior of foreign producers can lead to a redistribution of demand in the market and lead to unjustified benefits over other competitors, as companies like Lindt can still garner Russian demand for their products through brand recognition alone without delivering the same quality as in Western Europe. Lindt responded and denied that there are differences for its products sold in Russia and the EU, except for labeling.

In December 2022, Lindt was among one of many dark chocolate bars that have contained either high amounts of lead or cadmium metals, 
when compared against California's maximum daily allowable dose level,
according to Consumer Reports study "Lead and Cadmium Could Be in Your Dark Chocolate". The "Lindt Excellence Dark Chocolate 70% Cocoa" had 48% lead and 112% cadmium . The "Lindt Excellence Dark Chocolate 85% Cocoa" had 166% lead and 80% cadmium. The cadmium  levels are still within the EU limit of 0.80mg/kg for dark chocolate.

See also

List of bean-to-bar chocolate manufacturers

References

External links

 

Brand name chocolate
Swiss chocolate companies
Companies established in 1845
Companies listed on the SIX Swiss Exchange
Food and drink companies established in 1845
Luxury brands
Multinational companies headquartered in Switzerland
Swiss brands
Swiss confectionery
Companies based in the canton of Zürich
Museums in the canton of Zürich